Leucapamea formosensis is a moth in the family Noctuidae. It is found in Taiwan.

References

Moths described in 1910
Hadeninae
Moths of Taiwan